Kryvenko, or Krivenko, is a Ukrainian surname. Notable people with the surname include:

 Sergey Krivenko (1847–1906), Russian journalist, publicist, and editor
 Viktor Kryvenko (born 1982), Ukrainian politician

Ukrainian-language surnames